Mehranabad (also Romanized as Mehrānābād and Mihrānābād; also known as Mehrānābād-e Feyzābād and Mehrānābād va Feyzābād) is a village in Bahramabad Rural District, in the Central District of Eslamshahr County, Tehran Province, Iran. At the 2006 census, its population was 245, in 64 families.

References 

Populated places in Eslamshahr County